Half a Hundred Years is the 26th studio album by American country band Asleep at the Wheel. Produced by the band's frontman Ray Benson and manager Sam Seifert, it was released on October 1, 2021 by Home Records, a sub-label of Bismeaux Productions, with Thirty Tigers. The album was produced to mark the 50th anniversary of the band's 1970 formation and features a wide range of guest performers, including several former band members and frequent collaborator Willie Nelson.

The recording of Half a Hundred Years took place over the course of several months at numerous studios, with a wide range of guest contributors. Among the performers were numerous former members of Asleep at the Wheel, including key early members LeRoy Preston, Chris O'Connell, Lucky Oceans and Floyd Domino, as well as guest artists Bill Kirchen, George Strait and Emmylou Harris. The material is a mix between new original compositions, re-recorded tracks, and new cover versions.

Half a Hundred Years was preceded by the release of the Benson-written title track, a re-recorded version of "Take Me Back to Tulsa" (featuring Strait and Nelson), and Benson's "There You Go Again" (featuring Lyle Lovett) as singles. The album received positive reviews from critics, who praised the collection's "fun" nature and the contributions of several of its guest performers. It is being promoted on a concert tour during late 2021, featuring a number of former band members and special guests.

Background
In the years following the release of Asleep at the Wheel's 2018 album New Routes, the band's lineup changed a number of times: first, in 2019, saxophonist Jay Reynolds left and steel guitarist Eddie Rivers was replaced by Flavio Pasquetto; next, in 2020, long-time drummer David Sanger was replaced by Jason Baczynski; and finally, in 2021, Joey Colarusso took over the vacated saxophone role. All three new members performed on the 2021 EP Better Times.

According to Asleep at the Wheel frontman Ray Benson, the title Half a Hundred Years was conceived during a conversation he had with singer-songwriter Jamey Johnson at an Austin City Limits performance in 2020. Writing in an official press release for the album, he explained: "I went over to the ACL stage to see Jamey Johnson. I told him 'Ya know it's Asleep at the Wheel's 50th anniversary!' He looked at me and said, 'That's half a hundred years!'" Following this encounter, Benson wrote the title track inspired by his memories of the band's 50-year career, as he recalled: "I was trying to get across the sacrifices you have to make in 50 years on the road and the other positive side of it. The great experiences, the places I've been, and all the amazing people I've had the opportunity to meet and play music with."

Recording for Half a Hundred Years was initially planned to start on March 7, 2020 for a release in the fall of that year. However, due to the onset of the COVID-19 pandemic, the sessions were cancelled and the project delayed until the following year. Benson and fiddler/vocalist Katie Shore initially began recording tracks for the album at the frontman's home studio, with the rest of the current band members coming in later to add their parts. Later, former band members also contributed to a range of songs, with a lineup of Benson, bassist Tony Garnier, pianist Floyd Domino and drummer David Sanger recording basic tracks for the host of guest performers to overdub their parts later. Opening track "Half a Hundred Years" features Benson performing all instruments (guitar, bass, piano and drums) as well as vocals.

Reception
Media response to Half a Hundred Years was positive. Reviewing the album for online country music magazine Holler, Hal Horowitz wrote that "The 19-track, hour playing time zips along with so much enthusiasm that it feels half as long. Even though it's a bit of a mish-mash of re-recorded Asleep material with new songs, Half a Hundred Years is a constantly delightful recording that never takes itself too seriously." Similarly, Gary Whitehouse of the website A Green Man Review praised several elements of the album, including "Word to the Wise" featuring Bill Kirchen, "the big band tracks that really get my feet tapping and heart beating", and the instrumental "The Wheel Boogie". He concluded his review by stating: "We're lucky to have a band like Asleep at the Wheel still playing this kind of classic American music."

Track listing

Personnel

References

External links

Asleep at the Wheel albums
2021 albums